Harlan is an unincorporated community in Lincoln County, Oregon, United States, about 30 miles west of Corvallis. It is located in a valley of the Central Oregon Coast Range in the Siuslaw National Forest. The community's economy was once based on logging and sawmills. Cattle ranching is another mainstay of the local economy.

James R. Harlan helped establish a post office at this locale and the office was named for him. Harlan post office ran from 1890 until 1968; Harlan was the first postmaster. Harlan Cemetery was also founded in 1890.

In 1915, Harlan had a public school and a population of 200. A new school and a store were built in 1926. Harlan School closed in 1967 and students then attended school in Eddyville. The store, which housed the post office and was also a gas station, closed in 1971 and is now a private residence. In 1993, author Ralph Friedman reported that there was "nothing much" in Harlan. Chapel of the Valley church, built in 1961, still serves a congregation. The last commercial sawmill in Harlan shut down in the early 1980s. As of 2008, a small one-man hobby sawmill still operated.

References

External links
Gallery of Harlan images  from the Corvallis Gazette-Times
Historic images of covered bridges in the Harlan area from Salem Public Library
Images of the Harlan area from Flickr

Unincorporated communities in Lincoln County, Oregon
1890 establishments in Oregon
Populated places established in 1890
Unincorporated communities in Oregon